Kattuedayar is a village in Ulundurpet taluka of Kallakurichi district, Tamil Nadu, India.

According to the 2011 Population Census, Kattuedayar has a population of 5,374 people, divided into 1,167 families, with 2,736 males and 2,638 females.

References 

Villages in Kallakurichi district